WOW Hits 2008 is a two-disc compilation album comprising some of the biggest hits on Christian radio from the previous year. Disc one features more of the adult contemporary hits, while disc two features the CHR/Pop and Rock hits.  On November 12, 2008 the album was certified gold in the US by the RIAA.   The compilation peaked at No. 56 on the Billboard Hot 200 chart. This was the first collection in the series not to be certified at least Platinum.

Track listing

Bonus MP3 downloads

"Where Your Heart Belongs" – Mainstay
"The Twenty-First Time" – Monk and Neagle
"Come Undone" – Jackson Waters
"Not Afraid" – Stephanie Smith
"Let Go" – Grey Holiday
"You Are" – Mark Roach
"Salvation Station" – Newworldson
"It's Beautiful" – Eleventyseven
"A Lot In Common" – Group 1 Crew
"God In Me" – Daniel Doss Band
"Inside Out" – Cadia
"Praise and Adore" – Wavorly
"3 Minute Song" – Josh Wilson

Those who purchased WOW Hits 2008 were able to download bonus MP3s and videos (now no longer available).

Charts

See also
 WOW series

References

External links
 WOW Hits official website
 Find all the WOW HITS

2007 compilation albums
WOW series albums
2008